Assoc. may be an abbreviation for:
 Association (disambiguation)
 Associate (disambiguation)